The Crosby Case is a 1934 American pre-Code crime film directed by Edwin L. Marin and written by Warren B. Duff and Gordon Kahn. The film stars Wynne Gibson, Onslow Stevens, Richard "Skeets" Gallagher, Alan Dinehart, Warren Hymer, William Collier, Sr. and John Wray. The film was released on March 5, 1934, by Universal Pictures.

Plot

Cast 

Wynne Gibson as Lynn Ashton
Onslow Stevens as Francis Scott Graham
Richard "Skeets" Gallagher as The Reporter - Miller 
Alan Dinehart as Inspector Thomas
Warren Hymer as Sam Collins
William Collier, Sr. as The Detective - Sgt. Melody
John Wray as Willie McGuire
Edward Van Sloan as Professor Franz Lubeck
J. Farrell MacDonald as The Doorman - Mike Costello
Barbara Weeks as Nora
Paul Fix as Engineer

References

External links 
 

1934 films
1930s English-language films
American crime films
1934 crime films
Universal Pictures films
Films directed by Edwin L. Marin
American black-and-white films
1930s American films